East Raynham is a village and former civil parish, now in the parish of Raynham, in the North Norfolk district, in the county of Norfolk, England. The River Wensum flows close to the village. The village can trace its origins back and before the Domesday survey of 1086 when it was known as Reinham. Raynham, Massachusetts took the village's name at its incorporation in 1731 at the time of Charles Townshend, 2nd Viscount Townshend (1674–1738), Leader of the House of Lords. In 1931 the parish had a population of 130.

History
East Raynham's name is of Anglo-Saxon origin and derives from the Old English for the eastern portion of 'Regna's' homestead or village.

In the Domesday Book, East and West Raynham are listed together as a settlement of 33 households in the hundred of Brothercross. In 1086, the village formed part of the East Anglian estates of King William I, Roger Bigod and Reginald, son of Ivo. 

The town of Raynham, Massachusetts is named after East Raynham at the time when Charles Townshend was Lord of Raynham Hall.

On 1 April 1935 the parish was abolished to form Raynham.

Geography
East Raynham falls within the constituency of North Norfolk and is represented at Parliament by Duncan Baker MP of the Conservative Party. For the purposes of local government, the parish falls within the district of North Norfolk.

Raynham Hall

Raynham Hall is a Seventeenth Century manor house first built by Sir Roger Townshend. The hall still stands today, reputedly haunted by the Brown Lady and was the residence of Charles Townshend, an Eighteenth Century Secretary of State.

The Church of St. Mary
East Raynham's parish church is dedicated to Saint Mary and is situated in the parkland of Raynham Hall. The church was largely rebuilt in the mid-Nineteenth Century on the site of an older Medieval building by Clark and Holland of Newmarket. St. Mary's also holds a stone memorial to Maj-Gen. Charles Townshend, who was a distant relative of the Townshends of Raynham Hall, and the grave of Charles Townshend, 2nd Viscount. In 2002, the ring of bells were restored and, in July 2002, received a private visit from Queen Elizabeth II.

Recreation
Much of the area can be visited by a circular walk, which takes in mixed woodland, water meadows, arable land and historic buildings, almost entirely on the Raynham estate.

War Memorial
East Raynham's war memorial takes the form stone column topped with a crucifix. The memorial lists the following names for the First World War:
 Sergeant William H. Green (1884-1914), 1st Battalion, Royal Norfolk Regiment
 Sergeant Herbert W. L. Leonard (1889-1917), 1/5th Battalion, Royal Norfolk Regiment
 Lance-Sergeant Henry Green (1856-1918), Royal Defence Corps
 Lance-Sergeant George W. Carr (1890-1917), 8th Battalion, Royal Norfolk Regiment
 Gunner James Graver (1889-1917), 86th (Heavy) Battery, Royal Garrison Artillery
 Private Augustus Neave (1889-1918), 7th Battalion, Royal East Kent Regiment
 Private Benjamin W. Boggis (1890-1917), 13th Battalion, Durham Light Infantry
 Private Richard Plane (1894-1917), 2nd Battalion, Royal Norfolk Regiment
 Private Albert L. Fox (1896-1915), 1/5th Battalion, Royal Norfolk Regiment
 Private Arthur J. Boggis (1883-1917), 8th Battalion, Royal Norfolk Regiment
 Private Bertie T. Vertigan (1890-1917), 15th Battalion, Sherwood Foresters
 Private Cecil E. West (1884-1917), 1/8th Battalion, Royal Warwickshire Regiment
 J. Neave

And, the following for the Second World War:
 Lieutenant Maurice G. R. Kingsford (1923-1944), 5th Battalion, Grenadier Guards
 Lieutenant Nicholas J. R. J. T. Durham (1905-1943), 6th Battalion, Grenadier Guards
 Warrant-Officer Edgar A. Brown (1922-1945), No. 55 Squadron RAF
 Corporal Dorothy S. Roffe (1916-1943), Women's Auxiliary Air Force
 Aircraftman-Second-Class John Graver (1923-1942), Royal Air Force
 Private Basil W. Brown (1918-1941), Sherwood Foresters att. IX Corps Headquarters

Gallery

References

External links 

 2001 census
  Community transport

Villages in Norfolk
Former civil parishes in Norfolk
North Norfolk